Damdu is a community in the Savelugu-Nanton District in the Northern Region of Ghana.It is a less populated community with nucleated settlement.

References 

Communities in Ghana